Ginette Bouchard (1952 – 2004) was a Canadian photographer. Bouchard was born in Quebec City, Quebec and died in Montreal, Quebec.  

A posthumous exhibition of her work was presented in December 2004 at the University of Laval' Galerie des arts visuels in Quebec City. Her work is included in the collections of the National Gallery of Canada and the Musée national des beaux-arts du Québec.

References

1952 births
2004 deaths
Artists from Quebec City
20th-century Canadian women artists
20th-century Canadian photographers
21st-century Canadian women artists
21st-century Canadian photographers
Academic staff of Université Laval
Université Laval alumni